The 240mm/50 Modèle 1902 gun was a heavy naval gun and Coastal defense gun of the French Navy.

The type was used on the Danton-class battleships as secondary battery, mounted in six twin turrets.

The guns were later used as coastal artillery after the ships were broken up, and served during the Second World War, notably in the Battle of Dakar. One open-top twin gun turret is preserved at the battery Castel Gorée, where it has been installed after 1934 to the older coastal defence armoured turret.

Photo Gallery

Bibliography

References

External links 
 PIECES LOURDES : 240 et plus
 French 240 mm/50 (9.45") Models 1902 and 1906 

Naval guns of France
World War I naval weapons
240 mm artillery
Coastal artillery